Pam Minick (born June 27, 1955) was inducted into the National Cowgirl Museum and Hall of Fame in 2000.

Life
Pam Minick and her sister were raised on a ranch of five acres of land in Las Vegas, Nevada. The family had no horses at first. When Minick was 9 and her sister was 7, they decided they wanted some horses to ride. After their mother acquired two Palomino horses for them, they learned to ride at the local 4-H.

Career
Minick was Miss Rodeo America in 1973. She was the Women's World Champion Calf Roper. She also qualified for the Women's National Finals Rodeo in team roping. Minick still competes in barrel racing and team roping. She qualified for the Women's National Finals Rodeo 11 times. She is a rodeo sports commentator. She has been a commentator or interviewer in over 1,000 shows. These include rodeo, equestrian, and country music shows. In 1992, Minick co-announced for the major rodeo the Houston Livestock Show and Rodeo, becoming the first women to announce a major professional rodeo.

She and her husband Billy are part owners of Billy Bob's Texas, known nationally as the "World's Largest Honky Tonk" and is located in the Fort Worth Stockyards in Fort Worth, Texas. Minick held the position of marketing director for 25+ years; she also acted as the face of the venue.

Minick also has a television and film career. She is an actress in both television and movies. She also has served as the president of the Women's Professional Rodeo Association. Minick's popularity in all her roles increased attendance in the sport.

Personal
Minick now lives in Fort Worth, Texas, with her husband Billy. Her Las Vegas birth announcements always describe her as "Atomic Blonde".

Honors
 1992 Coca Cola Woman of the Year Award
 1994 Lane Frost Award
 1998 National Cowboy & Western Heritage Museum Tad Lucas Award
 2000 National Cowgirl Museum and Hall of Fame
 2004 Texas Cowboy Hall of Fame
 2006 Great Woman of Texas Award
 2011 Texas Trail of Fame
 2011 Texas Rodeo Cowboy Hall of Fame
 2016 Western Horseman Award
 2017 National Multicultural Western Heritage Museum and Hall of Fame

References

Cowgirl Hall of Fame inductees
Living people
People from Fort Worth, Texas
People from Las Vegas
Roping (rodeo)
Rodeo announcers
1955 births